Psilalcis pulveraria is a moth in the family Geometridae. It is found in Taiwan.

The wingspan is 29–33 mm.

References

Moths described in 1912
Boarmiini